HD 41004 is a visual binary star system in the southern constellation of Pictor. It is too faint to be visible to the naked eye, having a combined apparent visual magnitude of 8.65. The distance to this system is approximately 136 light years based on parallax. It is drifting further away from the Sun with a radial velocity of +42.5 km/s, having come to within  some 831,000 years ago.

The primary, component A, is a K-type main-sequence star with a stellar classification of K1V and a visual magnitude of 8.82. Torres et al. (2006) classed it as a K1IV star, suggesting it is a subgiant star that is evolving off the main sequence. It has 89% of the mass of the Sun and 104% of the Sun's radius. The star is radiating 63% of the Sun's luminosity from its photosphere at an effective temperature of 5,255 K. Its smaller companion, designated component B, is a red dwarf with spectral type M2V and apparent magnitude 12.33.

Companions 
A planet, HD 41004 Ab, was discovered by Zucker et al., in but not published until 2004. It has a mass >2.56 times that of Jupiter. It orbits the primary star at a separation of 1.70 astronomical units, taking  with a high eccentricity of 0.74.

HD 41004 Bb is a brown dwarf that at the time of the discovery was orbiting closer to the secondary star than any known extrasolar planet or brown dwarf (a=0.0177 AU), at only 145 km/s, because of its low-mass parent star, taking 1.3 days. Its orbit is circular despite the gravitational effect of HD 41004 A because of the tidal effect of the nearby star HD 41004 B. A search for cyclotron radiation from the magnetosphere of Bb in 2020 did not find any, indicating the planet is either weakly magnetized, or the emission cone did not point to Earth at the time of observation.

References

External links
 
 

K-type main-sequence stars
M-type main-sequence stars
Brown dwarfs
Planetary systems with one confirmed planet
Binary stars
Pictor (constellation)
Durchmusterung objects
041004
028393